Walter Brown (August 17, 1917 – June 1956) was an American blues shouter who sang with Jay McShann's band in the 1940s and co-wrote their biggest hit, "Confessin' the Blues".

Brown was born in Dallas, Texas. He joined McShann's orchestra, which also included the saxophonist Charlie Parker, in 1941. Brown sang on some of the band's most successful recordings, including "Confessin' the Blues" and "Hootie Blues", before leaving to be replaced by Jimmy Witherspoon.  in 1947 he recorded some sides with the Tiny Grimes Sextet, which resulted in their version of the hit "Open the Door Richard". The record was considered too risque and was banned from most radio playlists, and the label withdrew it from sale soon after.

Brown's subsequent solo singing career was unsuccessful, although he recorded for the King, Signature and Mercury labels, and he briefly reunited with McShann for recording sessions in 1949. His last two recordings were completed in Houston in 1951 and released on the Peacock label.

Brown died in June 1956 in Lawton, Oklahoma, as a result of drug addiction.

See also
List of blues musicians
List of people from Kansas City

References

1917 births
1956 deaths
American blues singers
Songwriters from Texas
Musicians from Dallas
King Records artists
Mercury Records artists
Drug-related deaths in Oklahoma
20th-century African-American male singers
African-American songwriters
American male songwriters